Johnny Plescio  (1964 – 8 September 1998) was a Canadian outlaw biker and gangster, who was one of the founding members of the Rock Machine Motorcycle Club. Plescio became widely known for his "strong-arm tactics" and was highly respected within the club.

Rock Machine
Born in Montreal, Plescio became close friends with Salvatore and Giovanni Cazzetta, with whom he would go on to become a founding member of the Rock Machine in 1986. He maintained a high rank in the club as well as great respect from its members and associates. Plescio would play a key role in co-leading the Rock Machine against the Hells Angels during the Quebec Biker War.

By 1993, the Rock Machine established a second chapter in the greater Montreal area, and Plescio was appointed president of the new Point-Aux-Trembles chapter. In mid-1993, he was arrested and charged for threatening an officer of the Montreal Police. Due to his defense lawyers' involvement in other cases, Plescio's trial would be delayed until 18 February 1994. During the proceedings, it was revealed that the charges against him stemmed out of an incident involving the Rock Machine in early 1993. The case involved Eric Toupin, a former club associate who had become a police informant after being arrested on narcotics trafficking charges. Michel Chartrand testified that on 7 July 1993, he heard Plescio telling two fellow Rock Machine members that he was going to "get" officer Jeffrey Stern. On 7 December 1995, the judge sentenced Plescio to three months in prison. On that same day, he and three other members of the Rock Machine were involved in an altercation with two members belonging to a support club of the Hells Angels, known as the Jokers MC. Plescio, Luc Gauthier, Paul Magnan and the Paradis brothers, Paul and Robert, were arrested and charged with "disturbing the peace".

As the Quebec Biker War turned into a battle of attrition, the Hells Angels began to gain the upper hand as ever-increasing levels of support poured in from around Canada and internationally. At the same time, the Nordic Biker War was taking place in northern Europe, and the Rock Machine was impressed with the way that the Scandinavian branches of the Bandidos held their own against the Scandinavian branches of the Hells Angels. In June 1997, three leaders of the Rock Machine – Plescio along with Fred Faucher and Robert "Tout Tout" Léger – went to Stockholm to seek support from the Swedish branch of the Bandidos, but were expelled by the Swedish police, who declared that they did not want Canadian bikers in their country.

Death
On 8 September 1998, Plescio, was at his Laval home watching television when his cable connection was severed. As he rose to see what was wrong with his television, 27 bullets were fired through the window of Plescio's living room, 16 of which struck his body, fatally injuring him. Plescio's funeral was held on 15 September 1998, attended by around 65 members of the Rock Machine and numerous other associates of the organization that came to pay their respects. A flower arrangement appeared bearing the word "Bandidos", which was the first sign that the Texas-based Bandidos biker gang was taking an interest in the Rock Machine. Authorities did not want any further incidents occurring so they provided security for the entrance of the funeral and demanded identifications from those entering.

References

1964 births
1998 deaths
20th-century Canadian criminals
Canadian male criminals
Canadian gangsters
Canadian prisoners and detainees
Prisoners and detainees of Canada
1998 murders in Canada
Criminals from Montreal
Deaths by firearm in Quebec
Organized crime in Montreal
People murdered by Canadian organized crime
Rock Machine Motorcycle Club
1998 in Quebec